The Hanover School District 28 is the school district serving students southeast of Colorado Springs, Colorado, United States.

List of schools

Elementary
Prairie Heights Elementary School

Middle/high
Hanover Junior-Senior High School

Charter

See also
List of school districts in Colorado

References

External links
 https://web.archive.org/web/20070807113606/http://hanover.ppboces.org/

School districts in Colorado
Education in Colorado Springs, Colorado